Kyaw Than (born 7 December  1956) is a Burmese politician who currently serves as  an Amyotha Hluttaw MP for Rakhine State  No. 10  Constituency . He is a member of Rakhine National Party.

Early life and education
He was  born on  7 December  1956 in Kyaukphyu, Rakhine State, Burma(Myanmar).

Political career
He is a member of the Rakhine National Party. In the Myanmar general election, 2015, he was elected as an Amyotha Hluttaw MP and elected representative from Rakhine State № 10 parliamentary constituency.

References

Arakan National Party politicians
1956 births
Living people
People from Rakhine State
Arakanese politicians